The Kel Ferwan are a Tuareg nomadic clan, who have historically been a subgroup of the Kel Ayr confederation. In the 20th century, they have mostly been based in the Aïr Mountains of north central Niger.

Tuareg confederations